HMY Kethailes was a steam yacht that was launched in 1903 as a private pleasure craft and commissioned into the Royal Navy in 1914. She was sunk in a collision in 1917 with the loss of 17 of her crew.

Private yacht
St Clare John Byrne designed the yacht for William Johnston of Liverpool. Richardson, Duck and Company built her at Thornaby-on-Tees, County Durham, England. She was launched on 11 April 1903. Johnston invented her name by combining letters from the names of his four daughters: Kathleen, ETHel, AILeen and EStele.

Naval service
When World War I began in 1914 the Royal Navy needed more ships. On 24 September 1914 Johnston voluntarily handed over the yacht (later receiving financial compensation) to the Admiralty, for use as an Armed Naval Auxiliary. She was commissioned as Armed Yacht No. 118032 in the Yacht Patrol. She patrolled the North Sea, then was transferred to the Irish Sea.

Two ratings were killed. The Commanding Officer, Lt Comdr Lane RNR and his crew were commended for preventing William Middleton from sinking.

Loss
On 11 October 1917 the troop ship Leicestershire accidentally rammed Kethailes in the Irish Sea near the Blackwater Lightship, which marks the Blackwater Bank off the east coast of County Wexford in Ireland. 17 of Kethailess crew were killed.

Leicestershire and the  P.44 rescued survivors, including her commander, and they were landed at Liverpool. The dead were lost at sea. Several bodies were subsequently washed ashore on the Welsh coast and were buried in local churchyards. In July 2022 CWGC accepted identification research of Able Seaman Frederick Dyer, previously buried as an unknown sailor in a communal grave in the Churchyard of St Matthew Borth, Dyfed .

References

 

1903 ships
Individual yachts
Maritime incidents in 1917
Shipwrecks of Ireland
Ships built on the River Tees
Steamships of the United Kingdom
World War I naval ships of the United Kingdom
World War I shipwrecks in the Irish Sea
1917 disasters in the United Kingdom